Aurora County is a county in the U.S. state of South Dakota. As of the 2020 census, the population was 2,747. The county was created in 1879, and was organized in 1881.

History
Aurora County, named for Aurora, the Roman goddess of the dawn, was created by the Dakota Territory on 1 October 1879. It was organized on August 29, 1881, when three county commissioners were appointed. The county had been established from the combination of former counties Cragin and Wetmore, which had both been formed in 1873. The three county commissioners met on 29 August 1881, and named Plankinton the county seat, an act which was ratified by voters in November 1882. The northern portion of Aurora County was partitioned off on April 17, 1883, and established as Jerauld County.

Geography
The terrain of Aurora County consists of low rolling hills, partially devoted to agriculture. It is dotted with small lakes and ponds. The highest point is the upper west boundary line, and the terrain slopes east-northeastward; the lowest point is the county's northeast corner at 1,325' (404m) ASL.

Major highways
 Interstate 90
 U.S. Highway 281
 South Dakota Highway 42

Adjacent counties

 Jerauld County - north
 Sanborn County - northeast
 Davison County - east
 Douglas County - south
 Charles Mix County - southwest
 Brule County - west

Protected areas

 Crystal Lake Public Shooting Area
 Hanson Lake State Public Shooting Area
 Kimball State Public Shooting Area
 Koch Waterfowl Production Area
 Kramer Slaugh Public Shooting Area
 Krell Waterfowl Production Area
 Lutz Waterfowl Production Area
 Maine Waterfowl Production Area
 National Waterfowl Production Area
 Pleasant Lake State Public Shooting Area
 Schute Waterfowl Production Area
 Sorenson Waterfowl Production Area
 Wilmarth Lake Game Production Area

Demographics

2000 census
As of the 2000 census, there were 3,058 people, 1,165 households, and 816 families in the county. The population density was 4 people per square mile (2/km2). There were 1,298 housing units at an average density of 2 per square mile (1/km2). The racial makeup of the county was 95.68% White, 0.29% Black or African American, 1.93% Native American, 0.10% Asian, 1.44% from other races, and 0.56% from two or more races. 2.09% of the population were Hispanic or Latino of any race. 48.0% were of German, 13.0% Dutch, 6.9% Norwegian, 6.6% English, 6.1% Irish and 5.8% United States or American ancestry.

There were 1,165 households, out of which 29.70% had children under the age of 18 living with them, 61.30% were married couples living together, 5.00% had a female householder with no husband present, and 29.90% were non-families. 28.20% of all households were made up of individuals, and 14.70% had someone living alone who was 65 years of age or older. The average household size was 2.45 and the average family size was 3.02.

The county population contained 27.60% under the age of 18, 6.50% from 18 to 24, 22.10% from 25 to 44, 22.20% from 45 to 64, and 21.60% who were 65 years of age or older. The median age was 41 years. For every 100 females there were 104.30 males. For every 100 females age 18 and over, there were 98.80 males.

The median income for a household in the county was $29,783, and the median income for a family was $37,227. Males had a median income of $25,786 versus $21,250 for females. The per capita income for the county was $13,887. About 7.80% of families and 11.40% of the population were below the poverty line, including 13.40% of those under age 18 and 12.00% of those age 65 or over.

2010 census
As of the 2010 census, there were 2,710 people, 1,102 households, and 736 families residing in the county. The racial makeup of the county was 95.1% white, 1.5% American Indian, 0.7% Asian, 0.4% black or African American, 1.8% from other races, and 0.5% from two or more races. Those of Hispanic or Latino origin made up 3.7% of the population. In terms of ancestry, 54.3% were German, 13.7% were Dutch, 11.8% were Norwegian, 8.7% were Irish, 7.2% were English, and 4.9% were American.

Of the 1,102 households, 28.3% had children under the age of 18 living with them, 57.5% were married couples living together, 5.4% had a female householder with no husband present, 33.2% were non-families, and 29.9% of all households were made up of individuals. The average household size was 2.37 and the average family size was 2.96. The median age was 43.2 years.

The median income for a household in the county was $45,230 and the median income for a family was $55,588. Males had a median income of $30,185 versus $27,206 for females. The per capita income for the county was $21,291. About 4.5% of families and 8.2% of the population were below the poverty line, including 7.4% of those under age 18 and 12.8% of those age 65 or over.

Communities

Cities
 Plankinton (county seat)
 White Lake

Town
 Stickney

Census-designated places
 Aurora Center
 Storla

Townships

 Aurora Township
 Belford Township
 Bristol Township
 Center Township
 Cooper Township
 Crystal Lake Township
 Dudley Township
 Eureka Township
 Firesteel Township
 Gales Township
 Hopper Township
 Lake Township
 Palatine Township
 Patten Township
 Plankinton Township
 Pleasant Lake Township
 Pleasant Valley Township
 Truro Township
 Washington Township
 White Lake Township

Politics
Aurora County at one time favoured the Democratic Party and was one of just 130 counties nationwide to be won by South Dakota favorite son George McGovern, who grew up in adjacent Davison County. However, with the “Reagan Revolution” of the 1980s it has gradually turned into a strongly Republican county. The last Democrat to win a majority in Aurora County was Michael Dukakis in the 1988 election.

See also
National Register of Historic Places listings in Aurora County, South Dakota

References

 
1881 establishments in Dakota Territory
Populated places established in 1881